The Sunday Times Tech Track 100 is an annual league table published in association with The Sunday Times newspaper in the UK. It ranks Britain’s 100 private technology (TMT) companies with the fastest-growing sales over their last three years. It is published in The Sunday Times each September, with an awards event typically held in November, and networking dinners for alumni companies throughout the year. The league table is researched and produced by Fast Track, an Oxford-based research and networking events business.

About Fast Track 
Fast Track is a leading research and events company that has built a network of the UK’s top-performing private companies, from the fastest-growing to the biggest, through its rankings in The Sunday Times. Founded in 1997 by Hamish Stevenson, it now publishes seven annual league tables and brings company founders and directors together at invitation-only networking awards events and alumni dinners.

Criteria

Companies have to meet the below criteria to be able to qualify for the Tech Track 100 league table:

•	Independent technology company

•	UK registered, unquoted, and not subsidiaries

•	Sales of at least £250,000 in the base year

•	Sales of at least £5m in the latest year

•	Trading weeks in the base and latest years have to exceed 25

Companies that do not meet the criteria can still be considered for the Ones to Watch programme. This is a selection of companies that have either achieved, or predict, good sales growth.

Exclusions 

•	Excluded companies include payday lenders, computer resellers and companies that are equal joint ventures, or majority-owned by quoted or other companies. IT consultancies and IT services companies are required to generate a significant proportion of their sales from proprietary technologies.

Notable alumni companies

Tech Track 100 was launched in 2001 to recognise Britain’s private technology companies with the fastest-growing sales. Since its launch, more than 1,000 companies have appeared on the league table, including:

•	Blue Prism, the automation software developer, featured as a One to Watch in 2015 with sales of £4.5m. It floated in 2016 raising £21.1m. In June 2019, it acquired thoughtonomy, No. 4 in Tech Track 100 2018, in a $100m deal.

•	Ocado, the online supermarket, first appeared on Tech Track 100 in 2006 with sales of £143m. It floated in 2010.

•	Sophos, the cybersecurity software provider, which first featured in 2002, was valued at £1bn when it floated in 2015.

•	Just Eat, the online takeaway business, which first featured in 2011, was valued at £1.5bn when it floated in 2014, and merged with Dutch firm, Takeaway.com, in a £6.2bn deal in 2020.

•	King, the gaming website operator, first appeared on Tech Track 100 in 2007, floated in 2014 and was acquired by Activision Blizzard for $5.9bn in 2016.

Latest Tech Track 100 league table

The 20th anniversary Sunday Times Tech Track 100 league table supplement was published on 6 September 2020 and featured companies such as tech unicorns Darktrace, Checkout.com and TransferWise. The top company was Revolut, the digital banking services provider.

Previous rankings
The 2012 Sunday Times Tech Track 100 league table ranked the top 100 of Britain's private technology, digital media and telecoms (TMT) companies that demonstrated the fastest sales growth over the preceding three years, between 2008 and 2011, or between 2009 and 2012.

The 2012 Tech Track included a new category, Ones to Recognise, for the first time since the inaugural awards in 1997. This is a list of five companies which demonstrate strong potential but did not make it into the top 100 spots.

2011 top ten rankings

2010 top ten rankings

2009 top ten rankings

2008 top ten rankings

2007 top ten rankings

2006 top ten rankings

2005 top ten rankings

Other Fast Track publications
Tech Track 100 is one of seven league tables of private companies produced by "Fast Track" and published in The Sunday Times:
Fast Track 100 – ranks the UK’s fastest-growing private companies based on sales (excluding TMT companies, which appear in Tech Track 100)
SME Export Track 100 – ranks the UK's SMEs with the fastest-growing international sales
Tech Track 100 – ranks the UK’s fastest-growing private technology companies based on sales (the sister table to Fast Track 100) 
 International Track 200 – ranks the UK’s private mid-market companies with the fastest-growing overseas sales
 Profit Track 100 – ranks the UK’s private companies with the fastest-growing profits 
Top Track 250 – ranks the UK’s leading mid-market private companies based on sales and/or profits growth
Top Track 100 – ranks the UK’s biggest private companies based on sales

References

Superlatives
The Sunday Times (UK)